Hotvolleys Vienna is an Austrian volleyball club based in Vienna. The club was founded in 1953 as SK Görz 33.

Previous names
1953–1969: SK Görz 33
1969–1972: Limex
1972–1988: Club A. Tyrolia Wien
1988–1999: Donaukraft Volleyballteam Wien
1999–2000: Bayernwerk hotVolleys
2000–2001: e.on hotVolleys
2001–2002: Hotvolleys Wien
2002–2003: Vienna hotVolleys
2003–2009: Aon hotVolleys
2009–present: hotVolleys

External links
Official website

Austrian volleyball clubs
Volleyball clubs established in 1953
1953 establishments in Austria